

Canada
Manitoba Provincial Road 467

Japan
 Japan National Route 467

United States
  Kentucky Route 467
  Louisiana Highway 467
  Maryland Route 467 (former)
  Pennsylvania Route 467
  Puerto Rico Highway 467
  Farm to Market Road 467